The 2011 SLC Super Provincial Twenty20 was the 4th and final season of the SLC Super Provincial Twenty20, the official Twenty20 domestic cricket competition in Sri Lanka. The tournament was scheduled as a replacement for the 2011 Sri Lanka Premier League, which was postponed to 2012. As such, the tournament had a different format from previous seasons, featuring five teams, instead of six, and was held sometime between 21 and 31 July 2011. The Sri Lanka Premier League replaced the SLC Super Provincial Twenty20.

The season comprised 10 regular matches, two semi finals and a grand final.

Teams

Venue
All of the matches in the tournament will be played in R Premadasa Stadium, Colombo.

Rules and regulations

Points table

(C) = Eventual Champion; (R) = Runner-up.
Winner qualified for the 2011 Champions League Twenty20.

Results

Group stage

Tournament progression

Fixtures

Round 1

Combined Provinces has a bye this round.

Round 2

Basnahira has a bye this round.

Round 3

Ruhuna has a bye this round.

Round 4

Wayamba has a bye this round.

Round 5

Kandurata has a bye this round.

Knockout stage

Semi Final 1

Semi Final 2

Final

Statistics

Awards
 Man of the Tournament – Tillakaratne Dilshan: 76 runs (45 balls), highest score of 56* (34 balls) (Basnahira)
 Batsman of the Tournament – Dinesh Chandimal: 203 runs (168 balls), highest score of 88* (57 balls) (Ruhuna)
 Bowler of the Tournament – Dilruwan Perera: 6 wickets (11 overs), best innings bowling of 3/14 (4 overs) (Basnahira)

Most Runs
The top five highest run scorers (total runs) in the season are included in this table.

Last Updated 11 July 2012.

Most Wickets
The following table contains the five leading wicket-takers of the season.

Last Updated 11 July 2012.

Highest Team Totals
The following table lists the six highest team scores during this season.

Last Updated 11 July 2012.

Highest Scores
This table contains the top five highest scores of the season made by a batsman in a single innings.

Last Updated 11 July 2012.

Best Bowling Figures
This table lists the top five players with the best bowling figures in the season.

Last Updated 11 July 2012.

References

External links
 Tournament Page – Cricinfo

Inter-Provincial Twenty20
2011 in Sri Lankan cricket
Inter-Provincial Twenty20
2012 in Sri Lankan cricket